WVGA may refer to:

 Wide VGA, 800×480  graphics display resolution
 WVGA (FM), a radio station (105.9 FM) licensed to Lakeland, Georgia, United States
 WSWG (TV), a television station (channel 43) licensed to Valdosta, Georgia, United States, which held the call sign WVGA from April 1979 to May 1994